Mahonia × media is an interspecific hybrid shrub. Its parents are Mahonia oiwakensis subsp. lomariifolia (previously known as Mahonia lomariifolia) and Mahonia japonica. It was raised in gardens during the 20th century, and has become an important garden and landscape plant.

Description
The hybrids show some variation, but are generally intermediate in most characteristics between the two parents. The following description is of the clone 'Charity'.

These are medium to large shrubs, reaching  in height. The plants have an upright form, becoming bare at the base. There are between 7 and 11 pairs of leaflets, plus a terminal leaflet. The flowers are in somewhat spreading racemes, often as long as in M. japonica. There is some scent to the flowers, but it is not as strong as in M. japonica. Flowering goes on throughout the winter.

Different clones may resemble one or the other parent more closely. It is possible that other species of Mahonia have contributed to the stock ascribed to this hybrid. Mahonia bealei is considered particularly likely to be one of these as it is often confused with Mahonia japonica. Many clones have an upright architectural form derived from M. oiwakensis subsp. lomariifolia, though some resemble the M. japonica parent rather more.

Plants provide viable seed, and second generation hybrids have been raised.

The plants are especially valued in the garden because of their ornamental leaves, and because they flower through the winter.

Origin

The first recorded plant was found in a mixed batch of seedlings from Mahonia oiwakensis subsp. lomariifolia that was raised in Northern Ireland in 1951 or earlier. This plant was given the cultivar name ‘Charity’ at the Savill Gardens, England, where it first flowered. It has been widely cultivated since under this name. Other clones have since been described and distributed. The following cultivars have gained the Royal Horticultural Society’s Award of Garden Merit:-
’Buckland’ 
’Lionel Fortescue’ 
’Winter Sun’

References

media
Hybrid plants